Park In-young (born 18 March 1982) is a South Korean actress and singer. She debuted in 2009 with the musical Boeing Boeing. She graduated from Chung-Ang University.

Early life
Park In-young was born on 18 March 1982, in Seoul, South Korea. Park is the older sister of Leeteuk, a member of the boy band Super Junior. She resided in New Zealand before returning to South Korea following her parents' wishes. At one point, she studied at Chung-Ang University in the theater department. She is a Protestant.

Filmography

Television

Films

Music videos

Theatre

Discography

Digital singles

Notes

References

External links 
 

South Korean television actresses
South Korean film actresses
Actresses from Seoul
1982 births
Living people
Chung-Ang University alumni
South Korean Protestants
21st-century South Korean singers
21st-century South Korean women singers